Aswath Damodaran (born 24 September 1957), is a Professor of Finance at the Stern School of Business at New York University (Kerschner Family Chair in Finance Education), where he teaches corporate finance and equity valuation.

Background
Known as the "Dean of Valuation" due to his expertise in that subject, Damodaran is best known as the author of several widely used academic and practitioner texts on Valuation, Corporate Finance and Investment Management as well as provider of comprehensive, regularly updated fundamental data for valuation purposes. He is widely quoted on the subject of valuation, with "a great reputation as a teacher and authority". 
He has written several books on equity valuation, as well as on corporate finance and investments. 
He is widely published in leading journals of finance, including The Journal of Financial and Quantitative Analysis, The Journal of Finance, The Journal of Financial Economics and the Review of Financial Studies. He is also known as being a resource on valuation and analysis to investment banks on Wall Street.

Prior to joining NYU, he served as visiting lecturer at the University of California, Berkeley from 1984 to 1986. 
He was profiled in Business Week as one of the top 12 U.S. business school professors; he has also received awards for excellence in teaching from both universities. 
Damodaran also teaches on the TRIUM Global Executive MBA Program, an alliance of NYU Stern, the London School of Economics and HEC School of Management,  and for the Master of Science in Global Finance (MSGF), which is a joint program between Stern and the Hong Kong University of Science and Technology. 
He also teaches the "Valuation" Open Enrollment program for Stern Executive Education. Widely recognized for his online contribution in the world of valuation, Damodaran also teaches on the "Advanced Valuation" and "Corporate Finance" online certificates at NYU Stern.

Damodaran holds M.B.A. and Ph.D. degrees from the UCLA Anderson, along with a B.Com. in Accounting from Loyola College, Chennai and an M.S. from the Indian Institute of Management Bangalore.

Works
Applied Corporate Finance
Damodaran on Valuation: Security Analysis for Investment and Corporate Finance (1994) 
Damodaran on Valuation, Study Guide: Security Analysis for Investment and Corporate Finance (1994)
Investment Valuation: Tools and Techniques for Determining the Value of Any Asset (1995) 
Corporate Finance: Theory and Practice (1996)
Corporate Finance: Theory & Practice Test Bank (1997) 
Corporate Finance, Study Guide and Problems Manual: Theory and Practice (1997) 
Applied Corporate Finance: A User's Manual (1998) 
The Dark Side of Valuation: Valuing Old Tech, New Tech, and New Economy Companies  (2001) 2nd Edition (2009)
The Analysis and Use of Financial Statements 3rd Edition (2002) 
Building Public Trust: The Future of Corporate Reporting (2002) 
Core Concepts of Applied Corporate Finance (2003) 
Caliber Course Using Corporate Finance, 2nd Edition (2003) 
Investment Philosophies: Successful Strategies and the Investors Who Made Them Work  (2003)
Investment Philosophies: Successful Investment Philosophies and the Greatest Investors Who Made Them Work (2003)
Investment Fables: Exposing the Myths of "Can't Miss" Investment Strategies (2004) 
Valuation Approaches and Metrics: A Survey of the Theory and Evidence (2005) 
Foundations and Trends: Valuation Approaches and Metrics: A Survey of the Theory and Evidence  (2005)
Strategic Risk Taking: A Framework For Risk Management (2007) 
The Little Book of Valuation: How to Value a Company, Pick a Stock and Profit (2011)
Investment Valuation: Tools And Techniques For Determining The Value Of Any Asset, 3rd Edition (2012) 
Applied Corporate Finance (ACF), 4th Edition (2014)
Narrative and Numbers: The Value of Stories in Business (2017)

See also
 Cost-benefit analysis
 Indians in the New York City metropolitan region
 New Yorkers in journalism
 Price-to-earnings ratio

References

External links
Homepage
Biography, Homepage
Author Page SSRN
Author Page ScientificCommons

Living people
American economics writers
American male writers of Indian descent
American finance and investment writers
American textbook writers
Corporate finance theorists
UCLA Anderson School of Management alumni
Indian Institute of Management Bangalore alumni
New York University Stern School of Business faculty
Indian academics
Indian emigrants to the United States
University of Madras alumni
American academics of Indian descent
American male non-fiction writers
1957 births
Indian scholars